MYS or Mys could refer to:

Places  
 Mys, Perm Krai, a village in Russia
 Malaysia, ISO 3166-1 alpha-3 country code MYS
 Mysore Railway Station, Karnataka, India; Indian Railways station code MYS
 Mystic (Amtrak station), Connecticut, United States; Amtrak station code MYS

Other uses 
 Masisa, New York Stock Exchange symbol MYS, a Chilean company
 Minnesota Youth Symphonies
 Monaco Yacht Show
 Mystic Records

See also 
 
 Gaelle Mys (born 1991),  Belgian artistic gymnast